A by-election was held for the Australian House of Representatives seat of Groom on 9 April 1988. It was triggered by the resignation of National Party MP Tom McVeigh.

The by-election was won by Liberal Party candidate Bill Taylor.

A month before the poll, Taylor was publicly backed by former Queensland premier Sir Joh Bjelke-Petersen, who had been forced to resign as premier several months earlier, after losing the support of his National Party colleagues. Bjelke-Petersen said the Nationals had lost their way and turned their backs on traditional conservative policies.

Candidates

Australian Democrats – Mark Carew, the party's 1987 candidate.
Australian Labor Party – Linda Dwyer, the party's 1987 candidate.
Liberal Party of Australia – Bill Taylor, an officer in the Royal Australian Navy.
National Party of Australia – David Russell.
Independent – Peter Consandine, republican campaigner who later founded the Republican Party of Australia.
Independent – Vincent Burke. Burke later contested the Australian Senate as an ungrouped independent in 1990.

Results

See also
 List of Australian federal by-elections

References

Groom by-election
Queensland federal by-elections
Groom by-election, 1988
Groom by-election